Murray Todd is an Australian Paralympic athletics competitor.

He was from South Australia. At the 1976 Toronto Games, he competed in three athletics throwing events and won a silver medal in the Men's Shot Put 2. At the 1980 Arnhem Games, he competed in two athletics throwing events and won the gold medal in the Men's Shot Put 2.

References 

Paralympic athletes of Australia
Athletes (track and field) at the 1976 Summer Paralympics
Athletes (track and field) at the 1980 Summer Paralympics
Paralympic gold medalists for Australia
Paralympic silver medalists for Australia
Living people
Year of birth missing (living people)
Place of birth missing (living people)
Medalists at the 1976 Summer Paralympics
Medalists at the 1980 Summer Paralympics
Paralympic medalists in athletics (track and field)
Australian male shot putters
Wheelchair shot putters
Paralympic shot putters